Timber Creek Airstrip (IATA:TBK, ICAO:YTBR) is a remote airstrip, located near the small remote town of Timber Creek in the Northern Territiory. The airstrip is used as an emergency landing area for RFDS aircraft, and for public use. The airstrip has an access road off the Victoria Highway.

Information 
The airstrip has 1 runway, which has a heading of 10/28. The runway is dirt . There is a small parking area off the runway. There are no facilities like a terminal or avgas.

References 

Airports in the Northern Territory